The 1980 United States Senate election in Pennsylvania was held on November 4, 1980. Incumbent Republican U.S. Senator Richard Schweiker decided to retire, instead of seeking a third term. Republican nominee Arlen Specter won the open seat, defeating Democratic nominee Peter F. Flaherty. As of 2022, this is the last time Philadelphia voted for a Republican statewide candidate. This is also the last Senate election where Butler County, Clarion County, Venango County, and Jefferson County voted Democratic.

Republican primary

Candidates
 Norman W. Bertasavage, candidate for U.S. House in 1976 from Pottsville
 Bud Haabestad, Delaware County Councilman
 Edward L. Howard, State Senator from Doylestown
 Arlen Specter, former District Attorney of Philadelphia and candidate for Senate in 1976 and Governor in 1978
 Andrew J. Watson, perennial candidate and chair of the Pennsylvania Constitutional Party
 Warren R. Williams
 Lewis C. Richards
 Francis Worley, former State Representative from Adams County and candidate for U.S. Senate in 1976 and Lt. Governor in 1978

Campaign
Arlen Specter, formerly a member of the Democratic party, had served as legal counsel to the Warren Commission, which investigated the 1963 assassination of President John F. Kennedy, after which he became District Attorney of Philadelphia. After he was defeated in a 1967 run for Mayor of Philadelphia, Specter was defeated in his bid for a third term as district attorney. He had run in the Republican primary in the 1976 Senate election, but was defeated by John Heinz and also ran in the 1978 gubernatorial election, but was defeated by Dick Thornburgh in the primary. Shortly after Specter opened a law practice in Atlantic City, New Jersey, incumbent Republican U.S. Senator Richard Schweiker unexpectedly announced his decision not to seek re-election to his seat. Specter, believing his reputation as a political moderate would help him in the general election, decided to run. In the Republican primary, Specter faced state senator Edward Howard, as well as Delaware County councilman Bud Haabestad, who was endorsed by Schweiker, then-governor Thornburgh and John Heinz.

Results
Specter ultimately defeated Haabestad, his most prominent challenger, by approximately 37,000 votes.

Democratic primary

Candidates
 Pete Flaherty, former Mayor of Pittsburgh
 H. Craig Lewis, State Senator from Feasterville-Trevose
 Peter J. Liacouras, Dean of Temple University Law School
 Edward Mezvinsky, former U.S. Representative from Penn Valley
 Joseph Rhodes Jr., State Representative from Pittsburgh
 C. Delores Tucker, former Pennsylvania Secretary of State

Campaign
In the Democratic primary, former Pittsburgh mayor Peter Flaherty contended with State Representative Joseph Rhodes, Jr., former U.S. Representative Edward Mezvinsky, State Senator H. Craig Lewis and Dean of Temple University Law School Peter J. Liacouras. Flaherty's name recognition enabled him to defeat his primary opponents, winning every county and thus winning the Democratic nomination.

Results
Flaherty's name recognition enabled him to defeat his primary opponents, winning every county and thus winning the Democratic nomination.

General election

Candidates
Lee Frissell (Consumer)
Peter F. Flaherty, former Mayor of Pittsburgh (Democratic)
Frank Kinces (Communist)
Linda Mohrbacher (Socialist Workers)
Arlen Specter, former District Attorney of Philadelphia (Republican)
David K. Walter (Libertarian)

Campaign
Flaherty employed a general election strategy he had used in two previous statewide office campaigns: win by a wide margin in the southwestern part of the state and narrowly win Philadelphia. He also hoped to carry several swing towns on account of his support from several labor unions. Specter hoped to carry his home town of Philadelphia, despite the Democrats' 7-2 voter registration advantage there. To this end, Specter sought endorsements among city Democratic leadership, including future mayor John F. Street. Specter hoped that, with wins in suburban areas and the heavily Republican central portion of the state in addition to winning Philadelphia, he would be able to win the election. Specter distanced himself from Governor Dick Thornburgh, who had become unpopular in some demographics due to his proposals to decrease welfare program spending.

Results

In the end, Specter defeated Flaherty by approximately 108,000 votes, carrying Philadelphia and its suburbs as well as the central and northeastern portions of the state. Flaherty performed strongest in the western portion of the state, including Cambria, Clarion, Erie and Mercer counties.

See also 
 1980 United States Senate elections

References 

1980 Pennsylvania elections
Pennsylvania
1980